The Bride with White Hair 2 is a 1993 Hong Kong film directed by David Wu. It is the sequel to The Bride with White Hair, with Brigitte Lin and Leslie Cheung reprising their roles as Lian Nichang and Zhuo Yihang. Although the first film is loosely based on Liang Yusheng's Baifa Monü Zhuan, this film is almost independent of the novel except for the main characters' names.

Plot
Lian Nichang felt betrayed by her lover, Zhuo Yihang, and has since morphed into the vicious "White-Haired Witch". She starts a cult which accepts women who were exploited by men. Its members include Chen Yuanyuan, who was betrayed by Wu Sangui. Meanwhile, Zhuo Yihang awaits on a snow-capped mountain for a rare flower to bloom, as he believes that it can turn Lian Nichang's hair black again. Lian Nichang vows to kill the surviving members of the eight major martial arts schools, who view her as their sworn enemy after she killed their seniors.

Feng Junjie, heir to the Wudang School's leadership position, marries Yu Qin, with the elders of the other schools as their witnesses. On the wedding night, Lian Nichang appears and kidnaps Yu Qin, leaving behind a trail of destruction and corpses. Feng Junjie survives the massacre and plans with the survivors to infiltrate the Witch's base and rescue his wife. Meanwhile, Lian Nichang brainwashes Yu Qin through a series of rituals and makes her see her husband and the eight schools as foes.

Feng Junjie and his companions confront the Witch and her followers in a battle but are defeated and only Feng and his friend are left of the group. They travel to the mountain in search of Zhuo Yihang, the only person who can stop the Witch from continuing with her brutal massacres. After enduring hardship, they fail to find Zhuo Yihang and decide to return to the Witch's base in a final attempt to save Yu Qin. Feng Junjie is no match for Lian Nichang and is almost killed by her when Zhuo Yihang suddenly appears and stops her.

Lian Nichang uses her hair to pierce through Zhuo Yihang's body, critically wounding him, but her hatred towards him gradually subsides as Zhuo gave Lian the same flower that could reverse her condition. Just then, Chen stabs Lian for betraying her own cult's principles, causing Lian to pull her hair out from Zhuo Yihang's body, and kills Chen in retaliation. The film ends with the deaths of Zhuo Yihang and Lian Nichang, who reconciles their past feud and laid to rest together as lovers, as well as Lian's white hair turning black again. On the other hand, Feng Junjie is reunited with his wife, who has recovered from her trance.

Cast
 Brigitte Lin as Lian Nichang
 Leslie Cheung as Zhuo Yihang
 Christy Chung as Ling Yue'er
 Sunny Chan as Feng Junjie
 Joey Meng as Yu Qin
 Cheung Kwok-leung as Duan Qi
 Lily Chung as Xinghui
 Lee Heung-kam as Emei Granny
 Ruth Winona Tao as Chen Yuanyuan
 Eddy Ko as Wu Sangui
 Law Lan as school elder
 Yu Chun-fung as Lan Lang
 Richard Suen as Lühen
 Jacky Yeung as Yi Fengxing
 Wong Sun as school elder

References

External links
 
 
 
 Review of the Australian DVD at Heroic Cinema
 Beyond Hollywood Movie Review

1993 films
Hong Kong fantasy adventure films
Wuxia films
Works based on Baifa Monü Zhuan
Films based on Baifa Monü Zhuan
Martial arts fantasy films
1990s Hong Kong films